Rhytiphora macleayi is a species of beetle in the family Cerambycidae. It was described by Lea in 1912. It is known from Australia.

References

macleayi
Beetles described in 1912